The following are the members of the State and Settlement Council, elected in the 1954 and 1955 state election.

Perlis

Kedah

Kelantan

Trengganu

Penang Settlement

Perak

Pahang

Selangor

Negri Sembilan

Malacca Settlement

Johore

See also
List of Malayan state and settlement electoral districts 1954–1959

Notes

References